Gilles Bogui (born 26 December 1972) is an Ivorian sprinter. He competed in the men's 4 × 100 metres relay at the 1992 Summer Olympics.

References

1972 births
Living people
Athletes (track and field) at the 1992 Summer Olympics
Ivorian male sprinters
Olympic athletes of Ivory Coast
Place of birth missing (living people)